Morley Township is an inactive township in Scott County, in the U.S. state of Missouri.

Morley Township was erected in 1872, taking its name from the community of Morley, Missouri.

References

Townships in Missouri
Townships in Scott County, Missouri